John Vogelstein (born December 9, 1934) is an American businessman who, with Lionel Pincus, established the "venture capital megafund" in the 1960s, while running the private equity firm Warburg Pincus.  He joined Pincus and the firm from Lazard Freres in 1967. Pincus was the founder and chairman while Vogelstein was vice chairman and then president.  During his time at Warburg Pincus, the company became the financial industry’s first $100 million fund in 1981, and the first $1 billion fund in 1986. He and Pincus went on to raise  billions of dollars to invest in companies across diversified industries.  He ran the company with Pincus until 2002, when they both stepped down.

Early life and education
Vogelstein was born in New York City. His parents were Ruth and Hans Vogelstein. He was a student at the Taft School in Watertown, Connecticut. Vogelstein then attended Harvard College for two years before leaving at age nineteen to begin his career in finance at Lazard.

Career
Vogelstein was at Lazard for 13 years, rising to become its head of research and then partner in early 1964, when he was 29. After a disagreement with senior partner Andre Meyer in 1967, he joined Lionel Pincus in founding the specialized financial services firm that would become Warburg Pincus, Vogelstein and Pincus developed the strategy of very large, long-term and diversified investments. As executive vice president, Vogelstein led the company’s negotiations in deals that included Twentieth Century Fox, Humana and Mattel. He was a member of the board of Twentieth Century Fox in the late 1970s, and elected to the board of production company Filmways after it was acquired by Orion Pictures in 1982. Vogelstein is credited for engineering Warburg Pincus’s 1984 financial rescue of toy company Mattel in which $231 million was invested.  As the largest shareholder in Mattel, Warburg Pincus managed the toy maker’s recovery and quadrupled its 45% investment in seven years.
Vogelstein and Pincus also negotiated the $1 billion rescue plan of Mellon Bank in 1988, using the “good bank-bad bank” structure wherein Mellon created a new bank to house troubled loans.
 
He was the company’s president and vice chairman until 2002. He became a senior adviser for Warburg Pincus starting in 2002 and remained a special limited partner of the firm. As of 2013, Vogelstein led the investment firm New Providence Asset Management, as chairman and general partner.

Personal life
Vogelstein married Barbara Louise Manfrey in 2000. His previous marriages ended in divorce. He has two sons, Fred and Andrew.
Vogelstein served as the chairman of the Taft School, Third Way, and chairman emeritus of the New York City Ballet and Prep for Prep.

References

Living people
1934 births